Xylophanes indistincta is a moth of the  family Sphingidae.

Distribution
It is found from south-eastern Brazil.

Description
It is similar to Xylophanes aristor but smaller. The ground colour is mostly grey-green, although the forewing underside has a pale yellow apical area on the costa and an orange-yellow ground colour.

Biology
Adults are probably on wing year-round.

The larvae possibly feed on Psychotria panamensis, Psychotria nervosa and Pavonia guanacastensis.

References

indistincta
Moths described in 1915
Endemic fauna of Brazil
Moths of South America